Automated optical inspection (AOI) is an automated visual inspection of printed circuit board (PCB) (or LCD, transistor) manufacture where a camera autonomously scans the device under test for both catastrophic failure (e.g. missing component) and quality defects (e.g. fillet size or shape or component skew). It is commonly used in the manufacturing process because it is a non-contact test method. It is implemented at many stages through the manufacturing process including bare board inspection, solder paste inspection (SPI), pre-reflow and post-re-flow as well as other stages.

Historically, the primary place for AOI systems has been after solder re-flow or "post-production." Mainly because, post-re-flow AOI systems can inspect for most types of defects (component placement, solder shorts, missing solder, etc.) at one place in the line with one single system. In this way the faulty boards are reworked and the other boards are sent to the next process stage.

SMT inspection 
AOIs for a PCB board with components may inspect the following features:
 Area defects
 Billboarding  
 Component offset
 Component polarity
 Component presence or absence
 Component Skew
 Excessive Solder Joints
 Flipped component
 Height Defects
 Insufficient Paste around Leads
 Insufficient Solder Joints
 Lifted Leads
 No Population tests
 Paste Registration
 Severely Damaged Components  
 Tombstoning
 Volume Defects
 Wrong Part
 Solder Bridging
 Presence of Foreign Material on the board

AOI can be used in the following locations in the SMT lines: post paste, pre-reflow, post-reflow, or wave areas.

Bare PCB inspection 

AOI for a bare PCB board inspection may detect these features:
 Line width violations
 Spacing violation
 Excess copper
 Missing pad – a feature that should be on the board is missing
 Short circuits
 Gold Finger damage
 Cuts
 Hole breakage – a drilled hole (via) is outside of its landing pad
 Wrong mounting components identified

The triggering of a defects report may be either rule-based (e.g. no lines on the board should be smaller than 50μ) or CAD based in which the board is locally compared with the intended design.

This inspection is much more reliable and repeatable than manual visual inspection.

In many cases, smaller circuit board designs are driving up the demand for AOI vs in-circuit testing.

Related technologies
The following are related technologies and are also used in electronic production to test for the correct operation of electronics printed circuit boards:
 Automated x-ray inspection (AXI)
 Joint Test Action Group (JTAG)
 In-circuit test (ICT)
 Functional testing

See also
Object recognition
Machine vision
Automated X-ray inspection
Under vehicle inspection

References

Hardware testing4. Automated Optical Inspection (AOI) Equipment List
Applications of computer vision
Printed circuit board manufacturing
Nondestructive testing